Admiral of the fleet is the highest rank in the Turkish Naval Forces. It is the equivalent of an Admiral of the fleet in other countries.

The rank can only be bestowed by the National Assembly, and only given to a general who leads a navy with an extraordinary success in battle gaining a victory over the enemy. The rank has never been awarded.

See also
 Military ranks of Turkey
 Military ranks of the Ottoman Empire

References

Admiral of the fleet

tr:Büyük amiral